Cthulhu Macula (formerly Cthulhu Regio) is a prominent surface feature of the dwarf planet Pluto, that is reminiscent of a whale in shape. It is west of the Sputnik Planitia region of Tombaugh Regio, also known as Pluto's "heart", and to the east of Meng-P'o, the easternmost of Pluto's "Brass Knuckles".

Description
The dark color of the region is speculated to be the result of a "tar" made of complex hydrocarbons called tholins covering the surface, which form from methane and nitrogen in the atmosphere interacting with ultraviolet light and cosmic rays. Tholins have been observed on other planetary bodies, such as Iapetus, Umbriel, and in the atmosphere of Titan, although the irregular and disconnected nature of the dark spots on Pluto has not yet been explained. The presence of craters within Cthulhu indicates that it is perhaps billions of years old, in contrast to the adjacent bright, craterless Sputnik Planitia, which may be as little as 100 million years old; however, some areas of Cthulhu Macula are smoother and much more modestly cratered, and may be intermediate in age. The eastern 'head' region consists mostly of heavily cratered 'alpine' terrain. The middle part of Cthulhu Macula is meanwhile a smooth plain, probably formed through large cryovolcanic eruptions, like Vulcan Planum on Charon. This part appears to be younger than the alpine terrain to the east, but there are nevertheless several large craters located in this region. The western 'tail' region of Cthulhu Macula was imaged in much lower resolution than the eastern part, but it can be inferred that this is a hilly landscape bordered by mountains to the west. Higher-resolution images of the border between the two regions indicate that lighter material from Sputnik Planitia, composed of nitrogen, carbon monoxide, and methane ices, may be invading and overlaying the easternmost part of the dark Cthulhu Macula. As of 30 July 2015, the eastern "head" region had been imaged in much higher resolution than the western "tail" region.

Naming

The feature was first identified in the initial image, first published on 8 July 2015, of Pluto returned after the New Horizons probe recovered from an anomaly that temporarily sent it into safe mode. NASA initially referred to it as the Whale in reference to its overall shape. By 14 July 2015, the provisional name "Cthulhu" was being used by the New Horizons team. It was named after the fictional deity from the works of H. P. Lovecraft and others. The character Cthulhu initially appeared in Lovecraft's 1928 short story "The Call of Cthulhu", as a malevolent entity hibernating within an underwater city in the South Pacific. In the book, it is the subject of worship by a number of human cults asserting that while it is currently trapped, Cthulhu will eventually return. In many of Lovecraft's stories, particularly The Whisperer in Darkness, the transneptunian planet Yuggoth is implied to be the same as Pluto, which was discovered around the time Lovecraft was writing the stories.

Surface features of Pluto are being given provisional, informal names that are selected from a list generated from an online poll conducted earlier in 2015, along the theme of "creatures related to underworld mythologies." "Cthulhu" was the most popular name in this category of the poll. The name received positive reaction from the press and social media, with a Chicago Tribune editorial supporting the name and its democratic origin. The name Cthulhu may be submitted to the IAU as an official name. Cthulhu Macula was initially called a regio, but is now considered to be the largest of the maculae that span Pluto's equator.

Cthulhu Macula contains many craters and linear features that have also been given informal names. Oort Crater, K. Edgeworth Crater, and Elliot Crater are large craters along Cthulhu's northern edge; Brinton Crater, Harrington Crater, and H. Smith Crater are near Cthulhu's eastern edge, and Virgil Fossa and Beatrice Fossa are linear depressions in Cthulhu's interior.

See also
Geography of Pluto
Lovecraft (crater) – a crater on Mercury

References

External links

Regions of Pluto
Cthulhu Mythos